Luo Luo is a Chinese novelist and film director.

Early life 
On April 30, 1982, Luo was born as Zhao Jiarong in Shanghai, China.

Career 
Luo directed the 2015 film The Last Women Standing based on one of her novels. Megan Tay translated her book in Malay when she's buying a Chinese 
novel in Beijing to Kuala Lumpur.

Filmography 
 2015 The Last Woman Standing - Director, Writer.
 2018 Cry Me a Sad River - Director, Writer.

References

External links 
 

21st-century Chinese writers
21st-century Chinese women writers
Chinese film directors
Chinese women novelists
Chinese women film directors
Living people
1982 births